Caroline Vanessa Grant,  (née Gray, born 17 August 1965) is an English vocal coach, television presenter and session singer.

Career
Grant is known for her work on the television talent contests Fame Academy, Comic Relief Does Fame Academy, and Pop Idol, and the children's television series Carrie and David's Popshop, together with her husband and colleague David Grant. She first came to fame as a singer in her own right with the pop group Sweet Dreams in 1983, when they represented the United Kingdom at the Eurovision Song Contest that year with the song "I'm Never Giving Up". They finished in the top six. In 2009, Grant was featured in the tenth episode of the second series of Total Wipeout.

Since 2010, she has been a regular reporter on BBC One's magazine programme The One Show. In 2012, she appeared on the ITV documentary, The Talent Show Story where she spoke about her time as a judge and coach. In May 2014, it was announced that Grant would be head of the United Kingdom national jury in the Eurovision Song Contest 2014. In January 2018, Grant participated in And They're Off! in aid of Sport Relief. In 2020, she appeared in the Channel 4 soap opera Hollyoaks as Zoe, alongside husband David and Tylan, who regularly portrays Brooke Hathaway in the soap.

Personal life 
She and husband David have four children: Olive, Tylan, Arlo and Nathan. All of their children are neurodivergent. Grant and David are both Christian, and run a church plant in their home.

Grant has suffered from Crohn's disease since the age of 18 and has been praised by science education charity Sense about Science for her efforts in raising the profile of the disease without making any scientifically unsound claims about available therapies.
She is a supporter of the Labour Party and addressed its conference in 2012, about why she valued the National Health Service.

Grant is also Patient Lead at The College of Medicine and has spoken at their conferences on involving patients in treatment choices.

Grant was appointed Member of the Order of the British Empire (MBE) in the 2020 Birthday Honours for services to music, media and charity.

References

External links 
 
 
 Carrie and David Grant (BBC Radio London)

1965 births
British vocal coaches
Eurovision Song Contest entrants for the United Kingdom
Eurovision Song Contest entrants of 1983
Living people
Place of birth missing (living people)
People from Enfield, London
English women singers
English television presenters
Labour Party (UK) people
People with Crohn's disease
Members of the Order of the British Empire
English Christians